Wontner is a surname. Notable people with the surname include:

Arthur Wontner (1875–1960), English actor
Gerald Wontner (1848-1885), British cricketer
Hilary Wontner (1912-1984), British actor
Hugh Wontner (1908–1992), English hotelier and politician
Tom Wontner (born 1971), English actor
William Clarke Wontner (1857–1930), English painter